Schützberg is a village and a former municipality in Wittenberg district in Saxony-Anhalt, Germany. Since 1 January 2011, it is part of the town Jessen (Elster).

Geography
Schützberg lies about 12 km west of Jessen on the Elbe.

Economy and transportation
Federal Highway (Bundesstraße) B 187 between Wittenberg and Jessen is about 12 km to the east.

References

Former municipalities in Saxony-Anhalt
Jessen (Elster)